Omer Goldman Granot, from the Tel-Aviv suburb of Ramat HaSharon, is an Israeli actress. She was a member of the Shministim, a young Israeli conscientious objector who became famous for being the daughter of Naftali Granot, former deputy to Mossad’s chief Meir Dagan.

She was sentenced to 21 days in military prison for refusing to serve the Israel Defense Forces on 22 September 2008, along with Tamar Katz and Mia Tamarin. She is one of about 40 high school students who signed the 2008 high-school seniors’ ("Shministim") protest letter. In order to prepare herself for her incarceration in a military prison, Goldman went to a psychologist every week. She has spent a second term in prison for refusing to serve again.

She notes that the crucial moment of her political awakening occurred when she went to the Palestinian village Shufa where the IDF had set up a roadblock and fired rubber bullets on a Palestinian demonstration.

From 2014 to 2018, Goldman was the female lead in the Israeli TV series Shchuna, and in 2018, she appeared as a regular in the first season of False Flag.

Aside from working as an actress Goldman also started to work as a director since 2020. For the tv series Palmach she did not only act in 4 episodes but also directed 11 episodes herself.

Filmography 
 2013: Bitter Lemon (short)
 2014-2018: Shchuna (TV series, 101 episodes) 
 2017: Hachaverim Shel Naor (TV series, 1 episode)
 2017: Shilton Hatzlalim  (TV series, 1 episode)
 2018: False Flag (Kfulim)  (TV series, 6 episodes)
 2019: Esau
 2021: Palmach TV series, 4 episodes)

References 
First Person: Omer Goldman - Financial Times 2008-11-22
Father, forgive me, I will not fight for your Israel - The Sunday Times 2008-12-10 (archived)
december18th.org
whywerefuse.org
Ed Asner: The Shministim - Huffington Post 2008-12-16
Radio interview with Omer Goldman - The Current (2009-1-8), a radio program of CBC with Anna Maria Tremonti

External links
 
 

 
 

Israeli conscientious objectors
21st-century Israeli actresses
Living people
1989 births
People from Ramat HaSharon